"Truth" is Yuna Ito's 6th single and last of 2006. This is her second single to be a part of the Nana franchise, the first being "Endless Story".

Overview
Truth was a sweeping ballad, making it her first ballad since Precious which was released on May 3, 2006. This single will be the ending theme to the movie Nana II, a movie which stars Mika Nakashima and Yuna Ito.

The PV for "Truth" was filmed in Scotland at Eileen Donan Castle as well as the performance to the b-side song Take Me Away that was used in the movie.

Track listing
 Truth
 Take Me Away
 Endless Story: Little Big Bee Lovespell Remix 
 Truth: Instrumental

Live performances
November 26, 2006 - MelodiX! - "Truth"
December 8, 2006 - Music Station - "Truth"
December 9, 2006 - Music Fighter - "Truth"
December 15, 2006 — NHK Pop Jam - "Truth"
December 23, 2006 — MTV's Cool Christmas - "White Christmas" and "Truth"
December 29, 2006 — Sakigake Ongaku Banzuke - "Precious" and "Truth"

Charts
Oricon Sales Chart (Japan)

2006 singles
2006 songs
Yuna Ito songs
Japanese film songs